The 2008 PDC Pro Tour was a series of non-televised darts tournaments organised by the Professional Darts Corporation (PDC). They consisted of Professional Dart Players Association (PDPA) Players Championships and UK Open Regional Finals.

Prize money

Players Championships
(All matches – Best of 5 sets, Best of 3 legs per set)

Stan James Players Championship 1 in Gibraltar on January 19

Final  John Part 3-1 Chris Mason  (2–1, 1–2, 2–0, 2–1)

Stan James Players Championship 2 in Gibraltar on January 20

Final  James Wade 3–1 Denis Ovens  (2–1, 2–0, 0–2, 2–1)

Players Championship at the Brentwood Centre, Essex on March 1

Final  Phil Taylor 3–0 James Wade  (2–1, 2–0, 2–0)

Players Championship at the JJB Stadium, Wigan on March 15

Final  Alan Tabern 3–0 Chris Mason  (2–1, 2–1, 2–0)

Players Championship at the Ramada Hotel, Bad Soden, Germany on March 22

Final  Phil Taylor 3–1 Raymond van Barneveld  (2–0, 1–2, 2–1, 2–1)

Players Championship at the Ramada Hotel, Bad Soden, Germany on March 23

Final  Phil Taylor 3–1 Wayne Jones  (2–0, 2–0, 1–2, 2–1)

Players Championship at the International Centre, Telford on March 29

Final  Phil Taylor 3–0 Colin Lloyd  (2–1, 2–1, 2–1)

Antwerp Darts Trophy (Players Championship) on April 12

Final  Phil Taylor 3–0 Andy Smith  (2–0, 2–1, 2–1)

Scottish Sun Players Championship at the Thistle Hotel, Glasgow on April 19

Final  Mervyn King 3–0 Mark Dudbridge  (2–0, 2–0, 2–0)

Amsterdam Casino Open Holland Masters (Players Championship) on April 26

Final  Raymond van Barneveld 3–0 Colin Osborne  (2–0, 2–0, 2–1)

Thialf Darts Trophy in Heerenveen on June 1
Event cancelled 

Players Championship (1) at Ashton Gate, Bristol on June 14

Final  Phil Taylor 3–0 Alan Tabern  (2–1, 2–1, 2–0)

Players Championship (2) at Ashton Gate, Bristol on June 15

Final  Dennis Priestley 3–2 Kevin Painter  (2–0, 2–0, 1–2, 0–2, 2–0)

Players Championship at Mandalay Bay Resort and Casino, Las Vegas, Nevada on June 29

Final  Phil Taylor 3–1 Ronnie Baxter  (2–1, 0–2, 2–0, 2–0)

Bobby Bourn Memorial Trophy at Winter Gardens, Blackpool on July 19

Australian Open Players Championship in Shoalhaven, New South Wales, Australia on August 10

Kitchener Open Players Championship in Kitchener, Canada on August 17

Peachtree Open Players Championship in Atlanta, Georgia on August 24

Players Championship (1) in Koningshof, Netherlands on August 30

Players Championship (2) in Koningshof, Netherlands on August 31

Ireland Open Players Championship at Dromore Leisure Complex, Dromore, County Tyrone on September 6

Final  Felix McBrearty 3–1 Chris Mason  (0–2, 2–0, 2–0, 2–0)

Windy City Open (Players Championship) in Chicago, Illinois on September 14

Final  Colin Lloyd 3–2 Wayne Mardle  (0–2, 2–1, 0–2, 2–1, 2–0)

Players Championship (1) in Newport, Wales on September 20

Final  Ronnie Baxter 3–0 Jamie Caven  (2–0, 2–0, 2–0)

Players Championship (2) in Newport, Wales on September 21

Final  Alan Tabern 3–2 Colin Osborne  (2–0, 1–2, 1–2, 2–0, 2–1)

Players Championship (1) in Dublin on October 4

Final  Phil Taylor 3–2 James Wade  (1–2, 2–0, 1–2, 2–0, 2–0)

Players Championship (2) in Dublin on October 5

Final  Dennis Priestley 3–1 Raymond van Barneveld  (2–0, 1–2, 2–1, 2–0)

Players Championship (1) in Scotland on October 18

Final  Alex Roy 3–2 Denis Ovens  (2–0, 1–2, 0–2, 2–0, 2–1)

Players Championship (2) in Scotland on October 19

Final  James Wade 3–1 Mark Walsh  (0–2, 2–0, 2–0, 2–1)

Players Championship (1) in Kirchheim, October 25

Final  Colin Osborne 3–2 Carlos Rodriguez  (1–2, 2–1, 2–1, 0–2, 2–1)

John McEvoy Gold Darts Classic in National Event Centre, Killarney on November 2

Final  Terry Jenkins 3–0 Andy Jenkins  (2–0, 2–0, 2–0)

Players Championship in Leiden, Netherlands on November 8

Final  Mervyn King 3–2 Raymond van Barneveld  (2–0, 0–2, 2–1, 1–2, 2–0)

Dutch Darts Trophy in Leiden, Netherlands on November 9

Final  James Wade 3–2 Mark Walsh  (1–2, 2–1, 0–2, 2–0, 2–1)

UK Open Regional Finals
(Quarter-finals best of 11 legs, Semi-finals best of 13 legs, Finals best of 15 legs)

Three of the eight 2008 UK Open qualifying events took place during 2007.

Blue Square UK Open Welsh Regional Final on September 23, 2007

Blue Square UK Open Irish Regional Final on October 7, 2007

Blue Square UK Open Scottish Regional Final on October 21, 2007

Blue Square UK Open North-East Regional Final at International Stadium, Gateshead on January 13, 2008

Blue Square UK Open South-West Regional Final at Wellsprings Leisure Centre, Taunton, February 10

Blue Square UK Open South-West Regional Final at the Brentwood Centre, Essex on March 2

Blue Square UK Open North-West Regional Final at the JJB Stadium, Wigan on March 16

Blue Square UK Open Midlands Regional Final at the International Centre, Telford on March 30

German Darts Corporation

The German Darts Corporation rankings are calculated from events across Germany, Austria and Switzerland. The top player in the rankings automatically qualifies for the 2009 World Championship.

Australian Grand Prix Pro Tour

The Australian Grand Prix rankings are calculated from events across Australia. The top player in the rankings automatically qualifies for the 2009 World Championship.

Other PDC tournaments
The PDC also held a number of other tournaments during 2008. These were mainly smaller events with low prize money, and some had eligibility restrictions. All of these tournaments were non-ranking.

References

External links
2008 PDC Calendar

PDC Pro Tour
PDC Pro Tour